John Barkstead (died 1662) was an English major general and regicide.

Barkstead was a goldsmith in London; captain of parliamentary infantry under Colonel Venn; governor of Reading, 1645: commanded regiment at siege of Colchester; one of the king's judges, 1648; governor of Yarmouth, 1649, Lieutenant of the Tower of London, 1652; M.P. for Colchester, 1654, and Middlesex, 1656; knighted, 1656: escaped to continent, 1660; arrested, 1662; brought to England and executed.

Biography
The date of Barkstead's birth is unknown, was originally a goldsmith in the Strand, and was often taunted by Robert Lilburne (a leveller) and the royalist pamphleteers with selling thimbles and bodkins. "Being sensible of the invasions which had been made upon the liberties of the nation, he took arms among the first for their defence in the quality of captain to a foot company in the regiment of Colonel Venn". On 12 August 1645 he was appointed by the House of Commons governor of Reading, and his appointment was agreed to by the Lords on 10 December. During the Second Civil War he commanded a regiment at the siege of Colchester.

In December 1648 Barkstead was appointed one of the judges of King Charles I. Referring, at his own execution, to the king's trial, he says: "I was no contriver of it within or without, at that time I was many miles from the place, and did not know of it until I saw my name in a paper . . . What I did, I did without any malice". He attended every sitting during the trial except that of 13 January. During the year 1649 he acted as governor of Yarmouth, but by a vote of 11 April 1650 his regiment was selected for the guard of parliament and the city, and on 12 August 1652 he was also appointed Lieutenant of the Tower of London. Cromwell praised his vigilance in that capacity in his first speech to the parliament of 1656: "There never was any design on foot, but we could hear of it out of the Tower. He who commanded there would give us account, that within a fortnight, or such a thing, there would be some stirring, for a great concourse of people were coming to them, and they had very great elevations of spirit". As Lieutenant of the Tower Barkstead's emoluments are said to have been two thousand a year.

In the parliament of 1654 Barkstead represented Colchester, in that of 1656 Middlesex. In November 1655, during the Rule of the Major Generals he was appointed major-general of the county of Middlesex and the assistant of Sir Philip Skippon in the charge of London. His services were rewarded by knighthood (19 January 1656) and by his appointment as steward of Cromwell's household.

Barkstead's conduct as Lieutenant of the Tower was attacked by all parties, and he was charged with extortion and cruelty. In February 1659 he was summoned before the committee of grievances, was obliged to release some prisoners, and was in danger of a prosecution.

At the Restoration Barkstead was one of the seven excepted both for life and estate (6 June 1660), but he contrived to escape to Germany, "and to secure himself became a burgess of Hanau." In 1662, however, he ventured into Holland to see some friends, and Sir George Downing, the king's agent in the United Provinces, having obtained from the states a warrant for his apprehension, seized him in his lodgings with John Okey and Miles Corbet. The three prisoners were immediately sent to England, and, as they had been previously outlawed, their trial turned entirely on the question of identity. Barkstead, with his companions, was executed on 19 April 1662. He showed great courage, thanked God he had been faithful to the powers he had served, and commended to the bystanders "the congregational way, in which he had found much comfort."

At the end of 1662 Samuel Pepys was commissioned by Earl of Sandwich and Sir Henry Bennet, Secretary of State, to search the Tower of London for £7,000, supposed to have been the proceeds of Barkstead's corrupt Governorship and hidden by him in or near the Governor's Lodgings. Pepys' four searches of the Bell Tower cellars and garden yielded nothing.

Notes

References

Attribution
 The sources used in this dictionary entry were:
Memoirs of Edmund Ludlow by Edmund Ludlow
The Thurloe State Papers contain much of Barkstead's official correspondence ;
Mark Noble's House of Cromwell (p. 419) gives a sketch of his career, of which the account in the Lives of the Regicides is merely a repetition;
Kennet's Register gives extracts from Mereurius Publicus and other sources on his arrest and execution.
The following contemporary pamphlets deal with the same events:
The Speeches, Discourses, and Prayers of Col. Barkstead, &c., faithfully and impartially collected, 1662
A Narrative of Col. Okey, Col. Barkstead, &c., their departure out of England. . . And the unparallelled treachery of Sir G-. D., 1662.
On the side of the government there is the official narrative, The Speeches and Prayers of John Barkstead, &c., with some due and sober animadversions, 1662, and A Letter from Col. Barkstead, c., to their friends in the Congregational Churches in London, with the manner of their apprehension, 1662 (this, according to a note of Wood's on the fly-leaf, was written by some royalist).

Further reading
 James Caulfield, The High Court of Justice: Comprising Memoirs of the Principal Persons, who sat in Judgment on King Charles the First and Signed his Death Warrant, John Caulfield, London 1820
David Plant.John Barkstead, Regicide, British Civil Wars and Commonwealth website

Year of birth missing
1662 deaths
Executed regicides of Charles I
English goldsmiths
English Congregationalists
New Model Army generals
Roundheads
Lieutenants of the Tower of London
People executed by Stuart England by hanging, drawing and quartering
Executed English people
People executed under the Stuarts for treason against England
English MPs 1654–1655
English MPs 1656–1658
English politicians convicted of crimes
Members of Cromwell's Other House